Chrysoclista hygrophilella is a moth of the family Agonoxenidae. It was described by Viette in 1957. It is found on Réunion.

References

Moths described in 1957
Agonoxeninae
Moths of Réunion
Endemic fauna of Réunion